Jakub Górski (c. 1525 – 1583) was a Polish Renaissance philosopher.

Life
Jakub Górski was an early Polish representative of Stoicism. He wrote a famous Dialectic (1563) and many works in grammar, rhetoric, theology and sociology.  A professor at Kraków University, he was an erudite man whose Dialectic gives evidence of extensive acquaintance with new currents and authors, but he was more erudite than independent as a thinker. He tended to eclecticism and sought to reconcile the Stoics with Aristotle.

See also
History of philosophy in Poland
List of Poles

Notes

References
Władysław Tatarkiewicz, Historia filozofii (History of Philosophy), vol. 2: Filozofia nowożytna do roku 1830 (Modern Philosophy to 1830), 8th ed., Warsaw, Państwowe Wydawnictwo Naukowe, 1978.

External links
 Works by Jakub Górski in digital library Polona

Neo-Stoics
1525 births
1583 deaths
16th-century Polish philosophers